Notoplax is a genus of chitons in the family Acanthochitonidae.

Species
 Notoplax acutirostrata (Reeve, 1847)
 Notoplax addenda Iredale & Hull, 1925
 Notoplax aenigma (Iredale & Hull, 1925)
 Notoplax alisonae (Winckworth MS, Kaas, 1976)
 Notoplax arabica Kaas & Van Belle, 1988
 Notoplax aupouria Powell, 1937
 Notoplax bergenhayni Kaas & Van Belle, 1998
 Notoplax brookesi Ashby, 1929
 Notoplax conica Is. & Iw. Taki, 1929
 Notoplax costata (H. Adams & Angas, 1864)
 Notoplax crocodila (Torr & Ashby, 1898)
 Notoplax cuneata (Suter, 1908)
 Notoplax curiosa (Iredale & Hull, 1925)
 Notoplax curvisetosus (Leloup, 1960): synonym of  Leptoplax curvisetosa (Leloup, 1960)
 Notoplax dalli Is. & Iw. Taki, 1929
 Notoplax facilis Iredale and Hull, 1931
 Notoplax formosa (Reeve, 1847)
 Notoplax gabrieli (Ashby, 1922)
 Notoplax glauerti (Ashby, 1923)
 Notoplax hemphilli (Pilsbry, 1893) 
 Notoplax hilgendorfi Thiele, 1909
 Notoplax hirta (Thiele, 1909)
 Notoplax holosericea (Nierstrasz, 1905)
 Notoplax jaubertensis (Ashby, 1924) 
 Notoplax kaasi Hong, Dell'Angelo & Van Belle, 1990
 Notoplax lancemilnei Gowlett-Holmes, 1988
 Notoplax latalamina Dell, 1956
 Notoplax leuconota (Hedley & Hull, 1912)
 Notoplax macandrewi Iredale & Hull, 1925
 Notoplax magellanica Thiele, 1909
 Notoplax mariae (Webster, 1908)
 Notoplax mayi (Ashby, 1922)
 Notoplax richardi Kaas, 1990
 Notoplax richeri Kaas, 1990
 Notoplax rosea (Leloup, 1940)
 Notoplax rostellata Kaas, 1990
 Notoplax rubiginosa (Hutton, 1872)
 Notoplax rubrostrata (Torr, 1912)
 Notoplax speciosa (H. Adams, 1861)
 Notoplax sphenorhyncha (Iredale & Hull, 1925)
 Notoplax squamopleura Bergenhayn, 1933
 Notoplax subviridis (Torr, 1911)
 Notoplax tateyamaensis (Wu & Okutani, 1995)
 Notoplax tateyamaensis Taki, 1962
 Notoplax tridacna (Rochebrune, 1881)
 Notoplax violacea (Quoy & Gaimard, 1835)
 Notoplax websteri Powell, 1937
 Notoplax wilsoni Sykes, 1896 
 Species brought into synonymy
 Notoplax aqabaensis: synonym of Leptoplax curvisetosa (Leloup, 1960)
 Notoplax curvisetosus Leloup, 1960 accepted as Leptoplax curvisetosa (Leloup, 1960)
 Notoplax doederleini Thiele, 1909: synonym of Leptoplax doederleini (Thiele, 1909)
 Notoplax elegans Leloup, 1981: synonym of Leptoplax curvisetosa (Leloup, 1960)
 Notoplax floridanus Dall, 1889: synonym of Cryptoconchus floridanus (Dall, 1889)
 Notoplax foresti Leloup, 1965: synonym of Craspedochiton foresti (Leloup, 1965)
 Notoplax producta (Phil): synonym of Craspedochiton producta (Carpenter in Pilsbry, 1892)

References

 
 OBIS
 
 
 
 Museum of Western Australia
 
 Powell A. W. B., New Zealand Mollusca, William Collins Publishers Ltd, Auckland, New Zealand 1979 
 Thiele J. (1909-1910). Revision des Systyems der Chitonen. Zoologica, Stuttgart 22: 1-70 + pl. 1-7 (1909) 71-132 + pl. 7-10 (1910)
 Gowlett-Holmes K.L. (1991) Redefinition of the genus Notoplax H. Adams, 1861, and recognition of the monotypic New Zealand genus Pseudotonicia Ashby, 1928 (Mollusca: Polyplacophora: Acanthochitonidae). Journal of the Malacological Society of Australia 12: 77-88.

 
Extant Oligocene first appearances
Chiton genera